Duality is the debut album by Canadian pop musician Luna Li, released March 4, 2022, by In Real Life Music. The album was nominated for Alternative Album of the Year at the Juno Awards of 2023.

Track listing

References 

2022 debut albums
Luna Li albums